The Creature of Kapu Cave is the 15th installment in the Nancy Drew point-and-click adventure game series by Her Interactive. The game is available for play on Microsoft Windows platforms. It has an ESRB rating of E for moments of mild violence and peril. Players take on the first-person view of fictional amateur sleuth Nancy Drew and must solve the mystery through interrogation of suspects, solving puzzles, and discovering clues. There are two levels of gameplay, Junior and Senior detective modes, each offering a different difficulty level of puzzles and hints, however neither of these changes affect the actual plot of the game. The game is loosely based on a book entitled Mystery on Maui (1998).

Plot
Nancy Drew goes to Hawai'i to serve as a research assistant to Dr. Quigley Kim, an entomologist. A devastating scourge is destroying the local pineapple crop. Residents are whispering that a secretive research compound has awoken the legendary Kāne 'Ōkala, a man who was killed in a volcano centuries ago and now prowls the Big Island wreaking havoc. Upon arriving, Nancy discovers Dr. Kim's camp has been ravaged, and Dr. Kim is missing. Coincidentally, the Hardy Boys are also on the island to complete a top-secret mission, so the three amateur detectives must team up to solve the mystery.

Development

Characters
Nancy Drew - Nancy is an 18-year-old amateur detective from the fictional town of River Heights in the United States. She is the main playable character in the game, and the player solves portions of the mystery from her perspective.
Frank Hardy and Joe Hardy - Frank and Joe are amateur detectives and old friends of Nancy. They are in Hawai'i to investigate the Mapu family for a company who plans on offering Pua a lucrative endorsement contract. They assist Nancy with her case and provide her with helpful information. Frank and Joe are also playable characters, and the player solves portions of the mystery from their perspective.
Big Island Mike Mapu - Mike Mapu runs "Big Island Mike's Immersion Excursions" with the help of his daughter Pua, but it seems like the tourists just aren't interested. He practically has to force tourists to catch fish, string necklaces, and go snorkeling. Could there be something shady about the way he does business?
Dr. Quigley Kim -  Dr. Kim is an absent-minded entomologist who has a tendency to digress. She is working hard to gain fame and funding. Too bad all the money is going to Dr. Craven's sophisticated facility instead. How far would she go to discover the latest breakthrough in entomology?
Dr. Malachi Craven - Dr. Craven is the highly temperamental director of operations at the Hilihili Research Facility. He has attracted the funds of many investors. Dr. Craven keeps his work highly secretive, so no one knows what's happening in his lab. What is he working on that he wants to keep top-secret?
Pua Mapu - Pua is a world-class surfer and the daughter of Big Island Mike. She helps run the business and spends every moment of her free time surfing or teaching others to surf. Could this seemingly sweet girl be hiding a dark secret?

Cast
Nancy Drew - Lani Minella
Frank Hardy - Jonah Von Spreekin
Joe Hardy - Rob Jones
Ned Nickerson - Scott Carty
Big Island Mike Mapu - Ross Douglas
Dr. Quigley Kim / Phone Recording - Leslie Wadsworth
Malachi Craven - Dan Murphy
Pua Mapu - Judith Knowles
Richard Aikens / Pawnbroker / Johnny Kuto / Yellow Suit Guard - Don Darryl Rivera
Gate Guard - RFA Krolmeister
Dr. Kim's Employer - Anne Grant

References

2006 video games
Detective video games
Video games based on Nancy Drew
Video games based on novels
Video games developed in the United States
Video games scored by Kevin Manthei
Point-and-click adventure games
Video games set in Hawaii
Windows games
Windows-only games
Her Interactive games
Works based on The Hardy Boys
First-person adventure games
Puzzle video games
Single-player video games
North America-exclusive video games